Yelena Budnik (born 9 May 1976) is a Belarusian sprinter. She competed in the women's 4 × 400 metres relay at the 2000 Summer Olympics.

References

External links
 

1976 births
Living people
Athletes (track and field) at the 2000 Summer Olympics
Belarusian female sprinters
Olympic athletes of Belarus
Place of birth missing (living people)
Olympic female sprinters